Girolamo Luxardo S.p.A. is an Italian liqueur factory. Founded in Zadar, it moved to Torreglia near Padua after 1945.

The company's current products include a variety of liqueurs and similar products (Maraschino, Sangue Morlacco, Sambuca, Amaretto, Grappa, Passione Nera, Slivovitz, Luxardo Fernet, etc.) as well as other baking related products, such as liqueur concentrates, fruit syrups, and jams. Luxardo products are sold in about 70 countries worldwide. The distillery employs approximately 45 people, as well as roughly 100 salespeople throughout Italy. The  distillery is capable of producing 6,000 bottles per hour. In 2010, it produced a pre-tax profit of €16 million.

History
The firm was founded in 1821 by Girolamo Luxardo in the city of Zadar, Dalmatia, at the time part of the Austrian Empire. Luxardo had moved to Zadar with his family in 1817, as the consular representative of the Kingdom of Sardinia. His wife (Maria Canevari) produced liqueurs at home, specializing in "rosolio maraschino", a liquor from Dalmatia, and Luxardo founded the distillery to produce Liquore Maraschino. Within eight years of existence, the Luxardo Maraschino was recognized a superior product by the Emperor. By 1839, the Luxardo Maraschino was consumed in overseas New Orleans.

Girolamo Luxardo died in 1865 at age 81, and his son Nicolò took over the business.

In 1913 a new distillery was built by Michaelangelo Luxardo, who was of the third generation of Luxardos. The distillery was one of the largest in the Austro-Hungarian Empire (maybe the largest distillery in Europe at one time). The building still stands today.

Zadar became part of the Kingdom of Italy as per the peace treaties at the end of World War I. The distillery was almost completely destroyed by Allied bombings during the Second World War. In 1944, at the end of Italian fascist and Nazi German occupation, the city was occupied by Yugoslav partisans and later integrated into Yugoslavia at the end of the war. Almost all the Italian citizens in the city and in all of Istria and Dalmatia, and among them most of the Luxardo family were forced to flee because of allegations of collaboration with the fascist regime and fear of ethnic persecution under the new Yugoslav authorities (see Istrian exodus), some of them were trialed and executed, like Nicolò Luxardo, his wife Bianca Ronzoni and his younger brother Pietro. The business was temporarily refounded in Venice by Giorgio Luxardo, who allegedly fled with a sapling of marasca cherry tree and stole an original Maraschino recipe, before Giorgio moved to Torreglia, near Padova, in the Veneto region of Italy, where he built a new distillery and continued the family's and firm's activities. The sixth generation of the family is still active in the operations of the company, including: Piero Luxardo, Franco Luxardo, Guido Luxardo, Matteo Luxardo, Filippo Luxardo and Giorgio Luxardo.

Marasca cherries 
The company owns a line of canned sour marasca cherries, branded Maraschino cherries.

The company owns 22,000 marasca cherry trees in what is the largest cherry orchard in the European Union. It also holds the naming rights to its own marasca variety.

Awards
In 2011 at the New York World Wine and Spirits Competition, the Amaretto di Saschira won double gold and best liqueur in show and the Triplum Triple Sec Orange won double gold and best fruit liqueur in show.

 2019: gold medal at the International Spirits Challenge

See also

List of Italian companies
Girolamo Luxardo (entrepreneur)

Footnotes

External links

 Luxardo | Maraschino "Excelsior" Girolamo Luxardo 

Companies based in Veneto
Distilleries in Italy
Italian brands
Italian Royal Warrant holders
Purveyors to the Imperial and Royal Court
Economy of Zadar